The 2015–16 Algerian Ligue Professionnelle 2 was the 52nd season of the Algerian Ligue Professionnelle 2 since its establishment, and its fourth season under its current title. A total of 16 teams contested the league.

Team overview

Stadia and locations

League table

Result table

Season statistics

Top scorers

Hat-tricks

Media coverage

See also
 2015–16 Algerian Ligue Professionnelle 1
 2015–16 Algerian Cup

References

Algerian Ligue 2 seasons
2
Algeria